Vesijärvi is a lake of  near Lahti in southern Finland. It suffered severe effects of eutrophication in the 1960s and a restoration programme began in the 1970s. The Enonselkä Basin is a part of Vesijärvi.

The name of the lake means The Water Lake.

Cyanobacteria Bloom Remediation
 Biomanipulation is an approach that applies the top-down model of community organization to alter ecosystem characteristics.
 Ecologists used cyanobacteria blooms as an alternative to using chemical treatments.
 Lake Vesijärvi was polluted by city sewage and industrial wastewater until 1976, at which point pollution controls reduced these inputs. By 1986 massive blooms of cyanobacteria began occurring, as well as dense populations of roach, a fish that benefited from the pollution's mineral nutrients. Roach eat zooplankton that otherwise keep cyanobacteria in check. To remediate this problem, ecologists removed about a million of kilograms of fish, reducing roach to 20% of their former abundance, between 1989 and 1994, and stocked the lake with pike perch which eats roach. The water has since become clear, and the last cyanobacteria bloom was in 1989.

In popular culture
 The ninth track on Geographer's 2012 album Myth is titled "Vesijärvi".

See also
 Enonsaari – an island located in the lake.
 Kajaanselkä Basin - a lake basin that connects to lake Vesijarvi
 Pikku-Vesijärvi

References

External links 

Kymi basin
Lakes of Lahti